The Agreement on Technical Barriers to Trade, commonly referred to as the TBT Agreement, is an international treaty administered by the World Trade Organization. It was last renegotiated during the Uruguay Round of the General Agreement on Tariffs and Trade, with its present form entering into force with the establishment of the WTO at the beginning of 1995, binding on all WTO members.

Purpose
The TBT exists to ensure that technical regulations, standards, testing, and certification procedures do not create unnecessary obstacles to trade.  The agreement prohibits technical requirements created in order to limit trade, as opposed to technical requirements created for legitimate purposes such as consumer or environmental protection.  In fact, its purpose is to avoid unnecessary obstacles to international trade and to give recognition to all WTO members to protect legitimate interests according to own regulatory autonomy, although promoting the use of international standards. The list of legitimate interests that can justify a restriction in trade is not exhaustive and it includes protection of environment, human and animal health and safety.

Structure of the agreement on technical barriers to trade
The TBT Agreement can be divided into five parts. The first part defines the scope of the Agreement which includes "[a]ll products, including industrial and agricultural" but not sanitary and phytosanitary measures. The second part sets out the obligations and principles concerning technical regulations. The third part addresses conformity and assessments of conformity. The fourth part deals with information and assistance, including the obligation of nations to provide assistance to each other in drafting technical regulations. Lastly the fifth part provides for the creation of the Committee on Technical Barriers to Trade and sets out the dispute settlement procedures.

Scope of application
According to Art.1, this agreement covers all industrial and agricultural products, with the exception of services, sanitary and phytosanitary measures (as defined by  Agreement on the Application of Sanitary and Phytosanitary Measures) and "purchasing specifications prepared by governmental bodies for production or consumption requirements of governmental bodies" (Art. 1.4).

The scope of the TBT consists of substantive scope (what measures are included), personal scope (to whom the measures apply), and temporal scope.

Substantive scope
There are three categories of substantive measures found in Annex 1 of the TBT; technical regulations, standard, and conformity assessment. The Appellate Body in EC-Asbestos held these to be a limited class of measures.

Technical regulation: annex 1.1

A technical regulation is a document stipulating conditions that is mandatory. The measures may include terminology, symbols, packaging or labelling requirements, and may apply to a product, process or production method.

The Appellate Body in EC-Sardines found there to be a three-step test for determining whether a measure is a technical regulation:
a)	The measure applies to an identifiable product or group of products;
b)	It lays down one or more characteristics of the product; and
c)	Compliance with the product characteristic is mandatory.

If a measure is found to be a technical regulation, it will be regulated by Article 2 TBT.

Standard: annex 1.2

A standard is a document approved by a recognized body that stipulates guidelines or characteristics that are not mandatory. It may include terminology, symbols, packaging or labelling requirements, and may apply to a product, process or production method. Standards are distinct from technical regulation in that they are not mandatory. Despite being voluntary, producers often have no choice but to comply with them for commercial practicality.

Standards are guided by Article 4 TBT and Codes of Good Practice.

Conformity assessment: annex 1.3

A conformity assessment is a direct or indirect procedure used to determine the fulfillment of requirements in a technical regulation or standard. Conformity assessments may include sampling, testing, and inspections.

The rules for conformity assessment are outlined in Articles 5, 6, 7, 8 and 9 TBT.

Issues of scope

Determining whether a measure is a technical regulation or a standard

Whether a measure is a technical regulation as opposed to a standard centers on whether it is "mandatory."

The Panel and Appellate Body in Tuna-Dolphin GATT Case (I and II) held that the US labeling measures for dolphin-safe tuna was a technical regulation. The requirements were not compulsory for the sale of tuna in the US, however the requirements were compulsory for dolphin-safe certification. The Appellate Body stated that because the US provided no other methods of obtaining the dolphin-safe label, the requirement was binding, and therefore  mandatory. It appears from this decision that measures that attempt to obtain a monopoly over a specific label will be deemed technical regulations, but the test is ultimately on a case-by-case basis.

This decision has been criticised for construing the term "mandatory" too broadly, rendering the distinction between technical regulations and standards meaningless.

Application to non-product related processes

Labels such as "free-range," "organic," or "fair trade," denote a quality in the product that has no tangible effects. Whether labels regarding non-product related process ("NPRP") are technical regulations is the subject of controversy.

Annex 1.1 states that technical regulations apply to "product characteristics or their related process and production methods", implying that this does not extend to NPRPs. However the second sentence of Annex 1.1 and 1.2 omits the word "related", suggesting that technical regulations may apply to labelling.  Some academics argue that sentence 2 is read in context of sentence 1, and should therefore be given narrower scope.

The Panel in Tuna-Dolphin GATT Case (I and II) did not clarify this issue, but held in that case that the dolphin-safe labeling was a technical regulation by reason of the second sentence. Accordingly, it may be assumed that labeling of NPRP-PPM products now fall under the scope of technical regulations.

Key principles & obligations

Non-discrimination
Members must ensure that technical regulations and standards do not accord treatments less favorable to imported products compared to the ones granted to like products of national origin or creating in any other country, as established respectively in Art. 2.1 and Annex 3.D.  This principle applies also to conformity assessment procedures, that have to "grant access for suppliers of like products originating in the territories of other members under conditions no less favorable than those accorded to suppliers of like products of national origin or originating in any other country in a comparable situation" (Art. 5.1 and 5.1.1).

Avoidance of unnecessary barriers to trade
Article 2.2 obliges Members not to create unnecessary obstacles to international trade and, on this basis, to ensure that "technical restrictions are not more trade restrictive than necessary to fulfil a legitimate objective". The Article provides an inclusive list of legitimate objectives including national security requirements and the protection of animal or plant life or health.

However Article 2.5 provides that where technical standards are for the purpose of one of the legitimate objectives listed in Article 2.2 and in accordance with relevant international standards they are presumed not to violate Article 2.2. (PDF here.)

Harmonization around international standards
When international standards exist, members shall use them as a basis for their technical regulations, standards and conformity assessment procedures, unless their use seems inappropriate or ineffective in certain circumstances (for example, for climatic or technological reasons) for achieving the pursued objective (Art. 2.4, 5.4 and Annex 3.D).   To support this, the World Trade Organization Technical Barriers to Trade (TBT) Committee published the "Six Principles" guiding members in the development of international standards.

Notification requirements
The TBT Agreement also obliges States to notify each other of proposed technical barriers to trade. To give States the opportunity to raise their concerns before the measures come into force, members must allow reasonable time for Members to make comments, discuss their comments and to have their comments considered. Members must notify each other in relation to proposed TBT provisions when the following three conditions are satisfied: 
 The measure must be a technical regulation or an evaluation of a conformity assessment procedure. 
 There must either be no relevant international standard or, if there is, the measure must not conform to it. 
 The technical regulation must have a considerable effect on international trade. 
These criteria are broader than any of the obligations regarding the content of technical regulations which ensures that any issues which will subsequently be litigated can be identified at the earliest stage possible. However, in the case of "urgent problems of safety, health, environmental protection or national security" Article 2.10 provides an alternate procedure to expedite the process.

Other informations

Adjudication of disputes
Under Article 14.1 disputes regarding the TBT Agreement are to be resolved by the Dispute Settlement Body in accordance with Articles XXII and XXIII of GATT. This requires parties to undergo the same consultation process as they would for issues arising under GATT and allows disputes involving issues arising under both the TBT Agreement and GATT to be resolved simultaneously. In spite of this very few cases concerning the TBT Agreement have been brought to the Panel.

The following list is an overview of the mechanisms that promote the TBT's mission:

A. All TBT members are required to establish "enquiry points" also known as "TBT Window" – offices that provide information about the country's technical regulations, test procedures, and adherence to various international standards.

B. A technical assistance program helps developing countries meet international standards and helps them get involved in the establishment of such standards.

See also
Codex Alimentarius
World Trade Organization

References

External links
Text of the TBT Agreement
Analytical Index to the TBT Agreement (annotations last updated, 2004).  

World Trade Organization agreements
Treaties concluded in 1994
Treaties entered into force in 1995
Treaties of Albania
Treaties of Angola
Treaties of Antigua and Barbuda
Treaties of Argentina
Treaties of Armenia
Treaties of Australia
Treaties of Austria
Treaties of Bahrain
Treaties of Bangladesh
Treaties of Barbados
Treaties of Belgium
Treaties of Belize
Treaties of Benin
Treaties of Bolivia
Treaties of Botswana
Treaties of Brazil
Treaties of Brunei
Treaties of Bulgaria
Treaties of Burkina Faso
Treaties of Burundi
Treaties of Cambodia
Treaties of Cameroon
Treaties of Canada
Treaties of Cape Verde
Treaties of the Central African Republic
Treaties of Chad
Treaties of Chile
Treaties of the People's Republic of China
Treaties of Taiwan
Treaties of Colombia
Treaties of the Republic of the Congo
Treaties of Costa Rica
Treaties of Ivory Coast
Treaties of Croatia
Treaties of Cuba
Treaties of Cyprus
Treaties of the Czech Republic
Treaties of the Democratic Republic of the Congo
Treaties of Denmark
Treaties of Djibouti
Treaties of Dominica
Treaties of the Dominican Republic
Treaties of Ecuador
Treaties of Egypt
Treaties of El Salvador
Treaties of Estonia
Treaties entered into by the European Union
Treaties of Fiji
Treaties of Finland
Treaties of France
Treaties of Gabon
Treaties of the Gambia
Treaties of Georgia (country)
Treaties of Germany
Treaties of Ghana
Treaties of Greece
Treaties of Grenada
Treaties of Guatemala
Treaties of Guinea
Treaties of Guinea-Bissau
Treaties of Guyana
Treaties of Haiti
Treaties of Honduras
Treaties of Hong Kong
Treaties of Hungary
Treaties of Iceland
Treaties of India
Treaties of Indonesia
Treaties of Ireland
Treaties of Israel
Treaties of Italy
Treaties of Jamaica
Treaties of Japan
Treaties of Jordan
Treaties of Kazakhstan
Treaties of Kenya
Treaties of Kuwait
Treaties of Kyrgyzstan
Treaties of Laos
Treaties of Latvia
Treaties of Lesotho
Treaties of Liechtenstein
Treaties of Lithuania
Treaties of Luxembourg
Treaties of Macau
Treaties of Madagascar
Treaties of Malawi
Treaties of Malaysia
Treaties of the Maldives
Treaties of Mali
Treaties of Malta
Treaties of Mauritania
Treaties of Mauritius
Treaties of Mexico
Treaties of Mongolia
Treaties of Montenegro
Treaties of Morocco
Treaties of Mozambique
Treaties of Myanmar
Treaties of Namibia
Treaties of Nepal
Treaties of the Netherlands
Treaties of New Zealand
Treaties of Nicaragua
Treaties of Niger
Treaties of Nigeria
Treaties of Norway
Treaties of Oman
Treaties of Pakistan
Treaties of Panama
Treaties of Papua New Guinea
Treaties of Paraguay
Treaties of Peru
Treaties of the Philippines
Treaties of Poland
Treaties of Portugal
Treaties of Qatar
Treaties of South Korea
Treaties of Moldova
Treaties of Romania
Treaties of Russia
Treaties of Rwanda
Treaties of Samoa
Treaties of Saudi Arabia
Treaties of Senegal
Treaties of Seychelles
Treaties of Sierra Leone
Treaties of Singapore
Treaties of Slovakia
Treaties of Slovenia
Treaties of the Solomon Islands
Treaties of South Africa
Treaties of Spain
Treaties of Sri Lanka
Treaties of Saint Kitts and Nevis
Treaties of Saint Lucia
Treaties of Saint Vincent and the Grenadines
Treaties of Suriname
Treaties of Eswatini
Treaties of Sweden
Treaties of Switzerland
Treaties of Tajikistan
Treaties of Thailand
Treaties of North Macedonia
Treaties of Togo
Treaties of Tonga
Treaties of Trinidad and Tobago
Treaties of Tunisia
Treaties of Turkey
Treaties of Uganda
Treaties of Ukraine
Treaties of the United Arab Emirates
Treaties of the United Kingdom
Treaties of Tanzania
Treaties of the United States
Treaties of Uruguay
Treaties of Vanuatu
Treaties of Venezuela
Treaties of Vietnam
Treaties of Yemen
Treaties of Zambia
Treaties of Zimbabwe
Treaties of Liberia